Désirée Zeljka Miloshevic is an Internet public servant, and was a special advisor to the chair of the
United Nations' Internet Governance Forum Multi-stakeholder Advisory Group.  Additionally, she is Senior Public Policy and International Affairs Advisor in
Europe for Afilias, the domain name registry.

Early life
Miloshevic studied English Literature at the University of Belgrade Faculty of Philology before starting her internet career at the then newly formed British service provider Demon Internet in 1993.

Other activities

Affiliations and positions
Special Adviser to the Chair of Internet Governance Forum Advisory Group (2006–2009)
Member of the Internet Society Board of Trustees (2004–2010) (2013–2019)
Member of the CPSR Board (2004–2010)
Member of the ICANN ccNSO 
Member of the IADAS Webby Awards
Member of the Irish ENUM Policy Advisory Board
Member of the Open Rights Group Advisory Council
Member of the CC UK Advisory Board
Chair of the SHARE Foundation Board of Directors (2018–present)

External links

ISOC
CPSR
Oxford Internet Institute
SHARE Foundation

Internet Society people
Miloshevic Desiree
University of Belgrade Faculty of Philology alumni
Year of birth missing (living people)